The Memorandum is the common name in English for the 1965 play Vyrozumění, by Czech playwright Václav Havel. The first English translation, by Vera Blackwell in 1967, used this title. In 2006, Canadian translator Paul Wilson published a new translation, titled The Memo at Havel's request.

The play is a black comedy that parodies bureaucracy and conformity. Havel wrote it prior to the Prague Spring of 1968 as an ironic satire dissenting against communist rule. Despite its veiled themes, the play was approved by government censors and published. The Memorandum centers on the introduction of a new language, "Ptydepe", that is meant to make work more efficient despite having the opposite effect. Sam Walters considers The Memorandum to be Havel’s masterpiece.

Plot
Josef Gross (Andrew Gross in the Wilson translation), a director of an unnamed organization, receives a memorandum written in Ptydepe, a constructed language, about an audit. He finds out that Ptydepe was created to eliminate emotional connotations and similarities between unrelated words (such as "fox" and "ox"). Gross tries to get someone to translate the memorandum for him, and gradually becomes opposed to the use of Ptydepe. He finally finds a reluctant secretary named Maria (Alice in the Wilson translation) who explains that, while she can translate the memorandum, she does not yet have a permit to do so.

The next day, Gross's deputy Jan Ballas (Max Balas in the Wilson translation) takes over his job. Gross becomes a "staff watcher", someone who spies on the workers of the unnamed organization. Meanwhile, Maria gets fired for translating Gross's memorandum. The last few Ptydepe learners in the organization give up on the language. After a while, Ballas gives his job back to Gross. Ptydepe is replaced with another language, Chorukor, one with very extreme similarities between words so as to make learning it easier, but finally it is decided to get back to the mother language. The play ends with most of the characters going to lunch.

Characters
Josef Gross (Andrew Gross)
Jan Ballas (Max Balas)
Pillar (Victor Kubs)
Maria (Alice)
Hana 
Helena (Talaura)
Stroll (Ken Masat)
Savant (Sid Maher)
George (Josh)
Thumb (Ms. Kalous)
Lear (J. V. Brown)
Column

Invented languages
The play's two fictional artificial languages, Ptydepe and Chorukor, are at the heart of the play's satire.

Ptydepe
According to the characters of the play, Ptydepe was constructed along strictly scientific lines, with none of the messiness and ambiguity of natural languages. In order to be able to express precisely all the subtle and easily  misunderstood nuances of natural language, Ptydepe has a large, non-expandable vocabulary. Another problem of natural language that Ptydepe was intended to eliminate is the frequent similarity of unrelated words, or homonyms. To entirely avoid the possibilities for confusion that arise with homonyms and similar unrelated words, Ptydepe was created according to the postulate that all words must be formed from the least probable combinations of letters. Specifically, it makes use of the so-called "sixty percent dissimilarity" rule; which states that any Ptydepe word must differ by at least sixty percent of its letters from any other word consisting of the same number of letters. This led to the necessity of creating some very long words. The inevitable problem of pronounceability is solved by breaking very long words up into smaller clusters of letters called "subwords", which nonetheless have no meaning outside of the word they belong to and are not interchangeable.

Length of words, like everything else in Ptydepe, is determined scientifically. The vocabulary of Ptydepe uses entropy encoding: shorter words have more common meanings. Therefore, the shortest word in Ptydepe, corresponds to what is so far known to be the most general term in natural language, whatever. (The longest word in Ptydepe, which contains 319 letters, is the word for "wombat" in an English translation. However in the Czech original it is a name for a nonexistent member of the genus Apus, .) Theoretically an even shorter word than  exists in Ptydepe, namely , but it has no meaning assigned and is held in reserve in case a more general term than "whatever" is discovered.

Havel's younger brother, computer scientist Ivan M. Havel, helped in its formulation.

In Czech, the word  has been used to mean incomprehensible bureaucratic jargon, or newspeak intending to hide its true meaning.

Example
From the memorandum discovered in the office in Scene 1:

Chorukor
Chorukor serves as the tentative replacement for Ptydepe at the end of The Memorandum.

Example
From Scene 11:
PERINA: Of course. How do you think Sunday is in Chorukor? Hmm?
(Only Kalous moves)So Kalous!
KALOUS: (standing up) . (he sits down)
PERINA: Correct, Kalous! Good point! Isn't it easy?

References

Havel, Václav. The Memorandum. Faber and Faber, 1989.
Havel, Václav. The Memo. Theater 61 Press, 2012.

External links
"The Memorandum | Introduction" Theater 61 Press website

"Thoughts on Vaclav Havel’s – The Memorandum", Elizabeth Doty, March 18, 2008
"The Memorandum", enotes

Plays by Václav Havel
1965 plays
Bureaucracy in fiction